Stagiaire may refer to:
Stage (cooking) or stagiaire, a cook who works briefly, for free, in another chef's kitchen
 Stagiaire (cycling), an amateur cyclist temporarily riding for a professional team
 A particular type of trainee, see European Civil Service#Staff

See also 
 Internship